Ann Maria Bocciarelli (also Anna 1897-?) was a South African aviator. In 1913, she was the first woman to earn a pilot's license in Africa.

Biography 
Bocciarelli was of Italian descent and was born in Kimberley in 1897. She was the daughter of the sculptor, Achille Bocciarelli.

In 1913, Bocciarelli was one of 10 citizen flight trainees sponsored by the Union of South Africa to train with the Paterson Aviation Syndicate. Like other pilots in the school, she trained on Compton-Paterson biplane. She earned her pilot's license in 1913, making her the first woman on the African continent to become a licensed aviator.

Eventually, she and her family returned to Italy.

References 

1897 births
Date of death missing
Date of death unknown
People from Kimberley, Northern Cape
South African aviators
Women aviators
20th-century South African women